Richard Lee Sutcliffe (born June 21, 1956), nicknamed "The Red Baron", is an American former Major League Baseball pitcher with the Los Angeles Dodgers, Cleveland Indians, Chicago Cubs, Baltimore Orioles, and St. Louis Cardinals between 1976 and 1994. Sutcliffe is currently a broadcaster for ESPN.

A right-hander, Sutcliffe was a three-time All-Star.

MLB career

Early years and Rookie of the Year
Sutcliffe's first full season in the majors was 1979. He won 17 games for the Los Angeles Dodgers and was the first of four consecutive Rookies of the Year for the Dodgers from 1979– (Steve Howe, Fernando Valenzuela, and Steve Sax were the others). Although Sutcliffe did not appear on the Dodgers' roster for their 1981 World Series championship run, he was awarded a World Series ring by the team. The Dodgers traded Sutcliffe to the Cleveland Indians for Jorge Orta, a journeyman outfielder, on December 9, 1981.

Chicago Cubs
In mid-, Cleveland traded a struggling Sutcliffe to the Chicago Cubs for Mel Hall and Joe Carter. Sutcliffe rebounded and won 16 games for the Cubs while losing only one, helping them to the division championship. On October 2, 1984, he started the first game of the NLCS against the San Diego Padres, giving up two hits and no runs, not only gaining the victory, but also hitting a home run in the third inning. Five days later, Sutcliffe pitched the final game of the series at Jack Murphy Stadium, but posted the loss after giving up four runs in the seventh inning.

Sutcliffe won the Cy Young Award with a unanimous vote, beating out Dwight Gooden and Bruce Sutter. He also finished fourth in the league MVP voting. When he re-signed with the Cubs as a free agent the following year, his contract briefly made him the highest-paid pitcher in baseball.

Sutcliffe started the  season strong, going 5–3 in his first eight starts, including two complete-game shutouts. A hamstring pull on May 19 limited his starts for the year, followed by a series of arm injuries which would limit Sutcliffe's effectiveness over the next two seasons. In , he bounced back to win 18 games and finished second in the league's Cy Young voting to Steve Bedrosian despite playing for a last-place Cubs team which also featured National League Most Valuable Player Andre Dawson. He also was presented 1987's Roberto Clemente Award, given annually to a Major League player who demonstrates sportsmanship and community involvement.

On July 29, 1988, in Philadelphia, Sutcliffe achieved one of baseball's rarest feats, especially for a pitcher, by stealing home plate during an 8–3 win over the Phillies, in which he also notched the victory. In , Sutcliffe won 16 games and made his final All-Star appearance, where he was managed once again by Tommy Lasorda. He also helped the Cubs to another division title, but the Cubs lost to the San Francisco Giants in the playoffs.

Later years
He retired with a career record of 171–139, with an ERA of 4.08. He holds the unique distinction of having won each of the following league awards, once each, and each in a different season: Rookie of the Year (1979), Cy Young Award (1984), ERA leader (1982), and wins leader (1987).

Non-pitching statistics
As a hitter, Sutcliffe was above average for a pitcher. He posted a .181 batting average (102-for-562) with 42 runs, 4 home runs, 55 RBI, 4 stolen bases and 34 bases on balls. He had a career-high 17 RBI in 1979 as a member of the Dodgers. In eight postseason games, he hit .500 (4-for-8) with 1 run, 1 double, 1 home run and 1 RBI.

Defensively, he was above average, recording a .973 fielding percentage which was 19 points higher than the league average at his position.

Broadcasting

After his retirement from baseball, Sutcliffe was the pitching coach for the Idaho Falls Braves (a farm team of the Padres) in 1996 and 1997. After his coaching stint in Idaho Falls, Sutcliffe became a color commentator for the Padres on Channel 4 San Diego from 1998 to 2004. 

Sutcliffe has served as an analyst for ESPN since 1998, when he served as a guest analyst for ESPN Radio’s coverage of that seasons MLB playoffs. He joined the network full-time in March 1999 and has appeared on Wednesday Night Baseball since 2002. ESPN announced that they had signed a multi-year extension with Sutcliffe in late 2018; he continues to be the lead analyst for their Wednesday Night Baseball coverage. Sutcliffe has also provided commentary for international coverage of the World Series via DirecTV/MLB International (1997–2002 and since 2010).

On March 13, 2008, Sutcliffe was diagnosed with "curable and maintainable" colon cancer. He underwent chemotherapy and radiation therapy in his hometown of Kansas City during the spring of 2008 and returned to work with ESPN on May 21, 2008. He continues to maintain a positive attitude and credits this to his faith, family encouragement, friends, and support from fans. He also is a motivational speaker for the Fellowship of Christian Athletes.

See also

References

External links
Rick Sutcliffe's ESPN Bio
, or Retrosheet

1956 births
Living people
Albuquerque Dukes players
American League All-Stars
American League ERA champions
Bakersfield Dodgers players
Baltimore Orioles players
Baseball players from Missouri
Bellingham Dodgers players
Chicago Cubs players
Cleveland Indians players
Cy Young Award winners
Iowa Cubs players
Los Angeles Dodgers players
Louisville Redbirds players
Major League Baseball broadcasters
Major League Baseball pitchers
Major League Baseball Rookie of the Year Award winners
National League All-Stars
National League wins champions
Sportspeople from Independence, Missouri
Peoria Chiefs players
San Diego Padres announcers
Sportspeople from the Kansas City metropolitan area
St. Louis Cardinals players
Tigres de Aragua players
American expatriate baseball players in Venezuela
Waterbury Dodgers players